Figueira is a village near Portimão in the Algarve in Portugal.  

In the English-speaking world its main claim to fame is the disappearance there, on 12 September 2004, of a local girl, eight-year-old Joana Cipriano, and the subsequent conviction of her mother and uncle for murder.  

Villages in the Algarve